Krásný Dvůr is a municipality and village in Louny District in the Ústí nad Labem Region of the Czech Republic. It has about 600 inhabitants.

Administrative parts
Villages of Brody, Chotěbudice, Chrašťany, Němčany, Vysoké Třebušice and Zlovědice are administrative parts of Krásný Dvůr.

Sights
Krásný Dvůr is known for the Krásný Dvůr Castle.

References

External links

 

Villages in Louny District